The Church of Les Billettes is a Lutheran church located at 22 rue des Archives in the 4th arrondissement of Paris. Built as a Catholic church in 18th century, it  adjoins the 15th century cloister of the Abbey of the Hospitaliers of the Charity of Notre Dame, also known as the Billettes. The 15th century church was demolshed , except for the cloister, and replaced by the new church In 1808, Under Napoleon I, it  became a Protestant Lutheran church.

The church is built in the Neoclassiscal style, while the earlier adjoining cloister is Gothic. The name of the church refers to the monks in the old abbey, who were known as the "Freres Billettes". To identify their order they wore an emblem called a billette.

The most famous feature of the church is the cloister, adjoining the church, dating from the 15h century. It is the only medieval cloister in Paris surviving in its original state..

History

The Legend and the First Church
Before the church was built, the site was occupied by an earlier chapel, built in 1295, known as "The Chapel of Miracles". According to the legend of the church, the site was originally occupied by the home of a Jewish merchant named Jonas. On Easter Sunday, April 2, 1290, Jonas had tried to profane Easter  by piercing  the host, the bread symbolizing the body of Christ, with a knife; The host bled the blood of Christ. He put it into boiling water, but it turned the water into blood.  He threw it into the fire, but it flew away. The host was found outside some time later by a neighbor, and was preserved as a sacred object until the Revolution. Jonas was arrested and convicted of  sacrilege, and was burned at the stake. His house was confiscated and demolished. The story was repeated in Medieval chronicles, and the site became a destination for pilgrims. In  1299 the Chapel of Miracles was built on the same site to commemorate the event. King Philippe IV of France  invited the order of the Charity of Notre Dame, also known as the Billettes, to arrange  services in the new church. The church continued to attract large numbers of pilgrims, it was rebuilt on a larger scale in 1405. and a cemetery and cloister were added in 1427.

17th-19th Century Church
In 1633, the abbey and church were taken over by a new order, the Carmelites of the Observance of Rennes. also known as the Carmes-Billettes. In 1742 the Carmes-Billettes began construction of a larger church,  They chose the architect Jacques Hardouin-Mansart de Sagonne (1711-1778) grandson of Jules Hardouin-Mansart, the founder the famed Mansard dynasty of architects. At that time Mansard de Sagonne was building the Cathédrale Saint-Louis de Versailles for King Louis XV at the Palace of Versailles, . He designed a larger church for Les Billettes which increased the number of worshippers from 960 to 1200.  Comstruction of the new church lasted from 1754 until 1758. From the original medieval church only the cloister was preserved. 

During the French Revolution, the church was closed and sold. The cloister was used as a workshop for carpenters, while the 
church was used to store salt. In  1808, the Emperor Napoleon authorized the city of Paris to buy the church, which was then transferred to the Consistory of the Lutheran Church, which was looking for a Paris home.

The Cloister 
THe cloister is the only surviving part of the earlier medieval Chapel of Miracles.  It was built in 1427, and was restored to its original form in 1968. It is composed of fouir galleries of arcades, supported by octagomal columns. The traverses are covered with Gothic rib vaults formed by  pointed arches, The keystones of the vaults are decorated with sculpture.

Exterior 
The facade of the church is in the neoclassical style, rising up in two levels. The lower level has Doric pilasters around the portal, while the upper level has Corinthian style pilasters. The triangular pediment at the top of the facde is in a fragile condition and is protected by a tapaulin, which hides the decoration.

Interior 
The interior of the church is in the neoclassical style. The choir is round, surrounded with pilasters in the  Corinthian style|. It is topped with a circle  of windows with white glass, with a dome above. The windows and pilasters cconinue along the upper walls of the church to the portal. There are two levels of balconies or tribunes along the sides  in the nave, supported by ionic style pillars.  The church original had only one level of balconies; the upper was added in 1824 by the Duchess of Orleans, who was an important patron of the church. Her loge had a separate concealed entrance, so she could come and go easily.

In keeping with the doctrine of the Lutheran church, the decoration of the choir is exxtremely simple; ony the most essential elements  are prsent; an altar, candles, a crucifix, and a lectern. The altar and lectern are recent creations made by Philippe Keppelin in the 20th century.

The organ of the church is found in the tribune at the end of the nave, over the portal. It is a modern instrument, made by the factor Mülheisen in 1982–1983.

Art and Decoration 
THe decoration of the church is rather austere, followong Lutheran tradition, but it does contain three notable paintings from the 17th century:
-"The Good Samaritan" and "The Healing of the blind man of Jericho, both painted by Johann Carl Loth (1632-1698). THey feature massive figures, dramatic illumination and warm colors, in the style of Mannerism.

-"Christ on the Cross" by Lubin Baugin (1612-1663), showing the body of Christ filling the canvas, delicately illuminated and perfectly poised, against a background of turbulence and darkneness.

Notes and citations

Bibliography (in French) 
Dumoulin, Aline; Ardisson, Alexandra; Maingard, Jérôme; Antonello, Murielle; Églises de Paris (2010), Éditions Massin, Issy-Les-Moulineaux,  (in French)
Hillairet, Jacques; Connaissance du Vieux Paris; (2017); Éditions Payot-Rivages, Paris; (in French).  (In French)

External links 
  Website of the church (in French)
 History of church on website of Protesant Churches of Franceh (in French)
  Article in French Wikipedia
 Site on history and art of the church (in French)
|Detailed article by Philippe Cachau on the history of the church (in French)

See Also 
List of historic churches in Paris